Kyaddala is a Ugandan drama television series by Reach a Hand Uganda. The first season was produced by Emmanuel Ikubese Films and Reach a Hand Uganda. Set in a present day high school life, Kyaddala a Luganda word for "It's Real", focuses on real life social issues that affect young people across Africa and their attempts to overcome those issues. The series features actors and actresses from Uganda, Kenya, Rwanda, and Nigeria. Kyaddala premiered on 27 September 2019 at Kingdom Kampala.

Plot

Season 1  
Eze's mother brings him with her from Nigeria to Uganda where she is taking up a new job. Eze has to get used to a new school, new people in a new country. He immediately becomes friends with Wonny, a rugby and soccer captain, gets in his circle of friends and makes a few enemies of himself when he starts hitting on Shamim. Eze, Wonny, Shamim, Umutoni all have different social, personal, financial and academic issues affecting them and with the help of each other, they devise means on how to overcome these issues.

Season 2
Kyaddala II follows the lives of high school old friends who are reunited by their admission to university. Caleb struggles with living an HIV positive life, a secret he keeps so long before it threatens to take his life, kills his friendships and takes away the only thing that mattered to him; 'Vapors lounge', a popular hangout spot that becomes the center of reunion with his new friend Wonny. Umutoni's past comes back to haunt her but this time through her friend Fifi, when she relives her friend's worst nightmare, faced with the hard choices she will choose to protect her girl child. The mysterious Miss Tina finds her true love when she meets Dave a struggling and disabled musician who makes it against all odds, while Shamim's independence from her recent marriage comes at a cost when she decides to defy the odds and take chances on making it on her own.

Cast and characters

Main cast

Selected recurring cast

Premiere
The series premiered at a black-carpet and a gold and black dress code event at the Kingdom Kampala on 27 September with most of the cast present. The series started airing in Uganda on NBS Television on 4 October, and Emmanuel Ikubese, the executive producer and director of the series announced that it would air in Nigeria, Kenya and later across the African continent. Kyaddala is a Luganda word meaning It's Real, hence the sub-title of the series.

Musical artists Kenneth Mugabi, Allan Toniks, Geosteady, Naava Grey accompanied by Kampala Symphony Orchestra (KSO) performed at the event.

Production
The series was produced by Emmanuel Ikubese Films together with Reach A Hand Uganda. Season one trailer was released on 24 September ahead of the series premier on 27 September 2019. The series started airing on 4 October 2019 on NBS TV. It was shot on location at Hana International Mixed School in Kampala and stars actors from Nigeria, Kenya and Uganda and aimed at addressing issues affecting all African youths. Usama Mukwaya joined the series as the producer, Emmanuel Ikubese and Humphrey Nabimanya executive produced the series while Loukman Ali, Alex Ireeta did cinematography and Lloyd Lutara and Allan Manzi joined as writers together with the show creator, Emmanuel Ikubese. The series was Ikubese's directorial debut.

Reception
The series was well received by critics. Roy Ruva of Chano8 wrote that the series would change the face of television in Uganda. It was confirmed that series will be  renewed for a second season. According to Usama Mukwaya, the show producer, the new is being written by a diverse team. "We have a diverse and inclusive crew of writers and cast, both seasoned and novices. We are also using this platform to nurture new talent", Usama Mukwaya said.

Season 2 is expected to follow a university setting and highlight challenges faced by young people at an advanced level of education, building up on  the first season which focused on secondary school life.

It was announced that Kyaddala would air again on Pearl Magic Prime both season one and two beginning 3 July, 2022.

Awards

Nominated
 2022: Uganda Film Festival Award for Best Actor in a Television Drama for Olumide Oworu
 2021: Best tv and webseries, 7th Mashariki African Film Festival
 2022: Uganda Film Festival Award for Best Television Drama
 2022: Uganda Film Festival Award for Best Actor in a Television Drama for Jawar Lwanda
 2022: Uganda Film Festival Award for Best Actress in a Television Drama for Tracy Kababiito

Episodes

Series overview

Season 1 (2019)

Season 2 (2022)

References

External links

2019 Ugandan television series debuts
Ugandan drama television series
Television series directed by Usama Mukwaya
Television series produced by Usama Mukwaya
2010s high school television series
NBS Television (Uganda) original programming
Pearl Magic original programming